Yeovil is a constituency in Somerset created in 1918 and represented in the House of Commons of the Parliament of the United Kingdom. It has been represented since 2015 by Marcus Fysh, a Conservative.

Boundaries 
1918–1974: The Municipal Boroughs of Yeovil and Chard, the Urban Districts of Crewkerne and Ilminster, the Rural Districts of Chard, Langport, Yeovil.

1974–1983: As 1918 but with redrawn boundaries.

1983–1997: The District of Yeovil wards of Blackdown, Chard North East, Chard North West, Chard Parish, Chard South East, Chard South West, Chinnock, Coker, Crewkerne Town, Dowlish, Egwood, Hazelbury, Houndstone, Ilminster Town, Lynches, Mudford, Neroche, St Michael's, South Petherton, Stoke, Windwhistle, Yeovil Central, Yeovil East, Yeovil North, Yeovil Preston, Yeovil South, Yeovil West.

1997–2010: The District of South Somerset wards of Blackdown, Chard Avishayes, Chard Combe, Chard Crimchard, Chard Holyrood, Chard Jocelyn, Coker, Crewkerne, Egwood, Hamdon, Houndstone, Ilminster, Mudford, Neroche, Parrett, St Michael's, South Petherton, Tatworth and Forton, Windwhistle, Yeovil Central, Yeovil East, Yeovil Preston, Yeovil South, Yeovil West, Yeovil Without.

2010–present: The District of South Somerset wards of Blackdown, Brympton, Chard Avishayes, Chard Combe, Chard Crimchard, Chard Holyrood, Chard Jocelyn, Coker, Crewkerne, Egwood, Hamdon, Ilminster, Ivelchester, Neroche, Parrett, St Michael's, South Petherton, Tatworth and Forton, Windwhistle, Yeovil Central, Yeovil East, Yeovil South, Yeovil West, Yeovil Without.

Main settlements

The seat covers the towns of Yeovil, Chard, Crewkerne and Ilminster in the county.

History 

From 1918 until 1983, Yeovil always returned a Conservative MP (though by only narrow margins over Labour in the 1940s and 1950s). There then followed a period of over 30 years during which the seat was represented by a member of the Liberal Party or their successors, the Liberal Democrats; firstly former leader Paddy Ashdown (1983–2001) and then former Chief Secretary to the Treasury David Laws (2001 to 2015). At the 2015 election, the seat returned to its former Conservative allegiance as Marcus Fysh defeated Laws by over 5,000 votes.

The South Somerset district voted 57% to leave the European Union, and academic analysis estimates that Yeovil itself voted 59% to leave. There was a swing of 7.7% away from the pro-Remain Liberal Democrats towards the pro-Leave Conservatives, which made the seat much safer in 2017, Marcus Fysh's majority increasing to just under 15,000. In 2019 the voters slightly increased this majority (to over 16,000).

Members of Parliament

Elections

Elections in the 2010s

Elections in the 2000s

Elections in the 1990s

Elections in the 1980s

Elections in the 1970s

Elections in the 1960s

Elections in the 1950s

Election in the 1940s 

Another general election was required to take place before the end of 1940. The political parties had been making preparations for an election to take place and by the Autumn of 1939, the following candidates had been selected; 
Conservative: John Fox-Strangways
Liberal: James Bateman
Labour: Malcolm MacPherson

Elections in the 1930s

Elections in the 1920s

Elections in the 1910s

See also 
 List of parliamentary constituencies in Somerset

Notes

References

Parliamentary constituencies in Somerset
Constituencies of the Parliament of the United Kingdom established in 1918
Yeovil